Nehren is an Ortsgemeinde – a municipality belonging to a Verbandsgemeinde, a kind of collective municipality – in the Cochem-Zell district in Rhineland-Palatinate, Germany. It belongs to the Verbandsgemeinde of Cochem, whose seat is in the like-named town. Nehren is a winegrowing centre.

Geography

The municipality lies at the south end of a long vineyard-covered ridge behind an old arm of the river Moselle.

History
In 634, Nehren had its first documentary mention. It arose from the Roman settlement Villa Nogeria. Beginning in 1814, it was part of Prussia’s Rhine Province, and since 1946, it has been part of the then newly founded state of Rhineland-Palatinate.

Politics

Municipal council
The council is made up of 6 council members, who were elected by majority vote at the municipal election held on 7 June 2009, and the honorary mayor as chairman.

Mayor
Nehren's mayor is Frank Liebfried.

Coat of arms
The German blazon reads: Im grünen Feld stilisierte römische Grabkammern in Gold.

The municipality's arms might in English heraldic language be described thus: Vert two stylized Roman tombs Or.

The arms were designed by A. Friderichs of Zell.

Culture and sightseeing

Buildings
The following are listed buildings or sites in Rhineland-Palatinate’s Directory of Cultural Monuments:
 Saint Agatha's Catholic Church (branch church; Filialkirche St. Agatha), Kirchstraße 24 – small irregular building, possibly partly still Romanesque in its walls; triaxial aisleless church and tower, second fourth of the 16th century; whole complex of church with walled graveyard
 So-called Antentempel – Roman grave of Nehren, reconstructions of a Roman tomb done in 1973/1974

Other sites
Although not a listed site, a Roman winepressing stone is also to be found in Nehren on the village square.

References

External links

 Nehren in the collective municipality’s webpages 
 Information about Nehren 

Cochem-Zell